Rebecca Marino was the defending champion, but chose not to participate.

Tímea Babos won the title defeating Julia Boserup in the final 7–6(9–7), 6–3.

Seeds

Main draw

Finals

Top half

Bottom half

References
 Main Draw
 Qualifying Draw

Challenger Banque Nationale de Saguenay
Challenger de Saguenay